Ricki Lake is a daytime tabloid talk show hosted by American actress Ricki Lake. The series debuted in syndication on September 13, 1993, and ended first-run episodes on May 21, 2004, continuing in reruns through the summer until August 27, 2004.

Series background
The show specialized in sensationalist topics involving invited guests and incorporated questions and comments from a studio audience. But unlike most of the counterparts of the day, her primary audience was aimed at teenagers, young adults, college students, and urban viewers (who described themselves as "Generation X") rather than the 25+ audience that advertisers were catering to, plus it was less sensational and tamer compared to the other programs. It was taped at the Chelsea Studios in New York City. During an interview on A Spoonful of Paolo, Lake stated that she almost signed up to do the show for only $5000.

Topicality
During the series' run, its primary focus was on dealing with personal subjects like parenting skills (including single mothers who are accused of having the lack of experience of taking care of children), romantic relationships (both marital and non-marital), LGBT issues (like discrimination, same-sex couples who want to have children or straight people attracted to a person who is LGBT or the other way around), racism and prejudice (even within their own race and gender), interracial relationships, family discord, revealing secrets, and social topics of the day (like money, looking for work or being on welfare). At times she had lighter shows, ranging from contests (including female impersonators, beauticians, or those who want to prove to others that they do have talent), celebrity guests, and reunions, to granting viewers' personal wishes.

A majority of the shows had surprises waiting in store for the guests, which were revealed by a doorbell ringing if a guest didn't come clean about themselves. This prompted Ricki to bring out another guest who knew the truth about the primary guest's intentions. At times, the guests would find out that someone else had been listening to their confession while they were on stage or in the audience. On one show in 1997 for example, a guy who admitted to having an affair was unaware that his wife was on stage (this after Ricki turn around and saw her sitting on the steps to ask her why she was there). The doorbell (and other surprises) were a major part of the series throughout its run. Lake's talk show sometimes covered serious topics, including domestic violence ("Bad Men, Desperate Woman"), homeless people who live in the NYC subway system ("The Catacomb People") and "Teens on Death Row". Lake also took on shows that dealt with women who were members of the Ku Klux Klan, and during a show involving marijuana, she learned that three guests were using the substance just moments after they walked on to the set as she was about to interview them.

One of Lake's most memorable and controversial confrontations happened during the first season, when she found herself dealing with Reverend Fred Phelps in a show that involved targeting anyone who carries the AIDS virus and why they deserve to die. (Phelps and his followers from Westboro Baptist Church in Topeka, Kansas had been picketing at funerals for AIDS victims across the United States, leading to several states to enact laws prohibiting or restricting groups from coming within a certain distance of the funerals.) When Phelps and his son-in-law tried to take over the set, a furious and insulted Lake ordered the Phelps family to leave the studio. During the commercial break, the two were forced off the set by the producers and escorted out of the building by security. After Phelps died on March 19, 2014, Lake tweeted on her Twitter page that when he was on the show he told her that she worshipped her rectum on camera, which led to Lake taking action off-stage to force Phelps off the show after that remark.

Methodology

The methodology for securing guests on the show, common to many shows similar to it, was as such: Producers would brainstorm and come up with a show title or theme. During an aired episode of the program spots would run for shows in pre-production. The goal was to recruit persons who may have a situation in their life that fits with the proposed topic. Hotline messages would be screened and the most promising prospects would be contacted by a production assistant. The potential guest would be interviewed about their situation. Guests chosen to appear on the show were booked airfare to New York City, brought to the television studio and sent to specific "green rooms", inside which they were briefed in more detail on how the show would be taped. One of the producers then sat down with each guest to reiterate the story, including emphasis on various phrases or statements the guest might have made during pre-interviews. Guests were given an appearance and confidentiality contract to sign and installments were recorded in real-time, which took approximately 80 minutes to complete. Lake came into the audience for taped segments and, during the paused portion (where commercial breaks were inserted), she left the audience to consult with producers. The final show was aired approximately one month later. However, if the guest (or guests) lied to the producers prior to coming on air, they were forced off the set and their travel arrangements cancelled. This happened twice during the show's run, and both events aired.

Awards and nominations
In 1994, the show was nominated for a Daytime Emmy Award for Outstanding Talk Show Host, but The Oprah Winfrey Show won the award. Other awards the show has garnered includes the Gracie Allen Award, PRISM Certificates & Commendations, and many more.

Aftermath
In 2000, Ricki Lake told her audience on The Rosie O'Donnell Show that her contract was up for renewal in 2004. In September 2003, rumors began swirling about the show's demise as Lake was in serious talks to be cast in a 30-minute sitcom for CBS. On January 21, 2004, The Futon Critic reported that "the show's future remains up in the air" due to the sitcom, and because Lake herself was not in attendance at the convention. In February 2004, the show was officially cancelled. Witnessing 9/11 from the rooftop of her New York City apartment, Lake has stated in several interviews that at that point she knew "I am getting out of my marriage, I am getting out of this show". On June 27, 2019, Ricki told Rupaul that two days after the attacks, she had to go back and do topics that, although still loving her show, didn't reflect what she wanted her legacy to be. Surprisingly, Sony Pictures didn't provide any comments when the show was cancelled, despite a large profit the show brought.

On October 9, 2005, Broadcasting & Cable magazine reported that Lake might return to do a new version of her show. A source said it would be a surprise if there was no deal struck by October 2005. If it were to have happened, it would have likely debuted in September 2006. Lake did not appear at the 2006 NATPE convention to pitch the proposed program to television stations in the United States in January, 2006, only furthering speculation that there would be no show. In a 2009 interview on CNN, she was asked about what was next for her. Lake noted that a follow-up documentary was coming out, and that she was in talks to do another talk show, but this has yet to come to pass. In follow-up interviews since then such as Oprah in 2010, Lake has consistently said "never say never" about hosting a new show, but that she is happy working on other projects. However, in a February 2011 appearance on The View, when asked about doing another show, Ricki said that she "misses the platform" and that when it comes to hosting another show, "that's certainly a possibility."

In March 2011 it was reported that three television studios, Disney–ABC Domestic Television, Universal Media Studios and CBS Television Distribution, were interested in bringing Lake back to talk television in 2012. This after Lake began appearing on various programs in which she expressed a desire to return to the genre. On April 20, 2011, Lake signed with 20th Television to develop a subsequent talk show for a September 2012 launch. It is described as having more of an Oprah-like format than her previous series.

Popularity around the world
The show was also popular in other countries, especially in the United Kingdom, where it aired on Channel 4, and was aired daily on ITV2, until 2009, as well as in Australia, where the show was screened on three channels: the Seven (1997-2002), Ten (late 1994-Early 1997) and pay TV-exclusive W Channel (2002-2004). The show was also successful in the Netherlands, where it aired on SBS6. Even though it has been out of production since 2004, the show is still screened in various places around the world such as Nigeria and in the Middle East.

Production/distribution
Garth Ancier and Gail Steinberg were the original executive producers. Michael Rourke moved into the executive producer role in 2002, during the 9th season, with Michelle Mazur, a former producer in the 1990s of the show, moved into the role of co-executive producer at the start of the 10th season. The theme was written by John Benitez. The show was produced by The Garth Ancier Company and was distributed by Columbia Pictures Television Distribution (1993–1995), then by Columbia TriStar Television Distribution (1995–2001), Columbia TriStar Domestic Television (2001–2002), and Sony Pictures Television (2002–2004). In the UK the series first appeared on Saturday October 1, 1994, on Channel 4 and continued until 2001.

Satire
Lake's talk show has often been the butt of satire, as noted by the following references below:
 It was repeatedly parodied during the 1990s on Saturday Night Live, with male cast member Jay Mohr impersonating Lake in drag, and in a MTV spoof on the series and its title fonts by actress/singer Debbie Loeb.
 It was mentioned in the chorus of the hit 1998 song "Pretty Fly (for a White Guy)" by The Offspring: "So if you don't rate, just overcompensate, at least you'll know you can always go on Ricki Lake." Lyricist Dexter Holland said the lyrics were inspired by the sort of young men who went to the show - "Guys who go to malls and get the gangsta rap clothes. Guys on Ricki Lake who don't listen to their moms.")
 It is also mentioned in the 2004 hit by Australian band Butterfingers, "I Love Work", as well as "Strong" by British singer Robbie Williams, "Hole in the Head" by British female vocal group Sugababes and "Little White Lie" by Tanya Stephens.
 The female group Shooter also mentioned the show in their song, "Life's a Bitch" ("Everybody's tellin' all, baring their souls, just to go on The Ricki Lake Show").
 It was also mentioned in an episode of the TV show Family Guy entitled "Peter, Peter, Caviar Eater", in which Brian, attempting to rehabilitate Peter in the ways of a gentleman, electrically shocks Peter every time he looks at a television showing an episode of Ricki Lake.
 In the WB series Gilmore Girls, Rory mentions feeling like she is on The Ricki Lake Show, with Lorelai then replying, "Go, Rory! Go, Rory!"
 The music video for the song "Perfect Match" by the hip hop group Cella Dwellas is largely a satire of Lake's shows about cheating spouses.
 Ricki Lake is also mentioned in the Kesha and Nicki Minaj remix of Britney Spears' "Till the World Ends", referring to Lil' Kim being at the height of her career when Ricki Lake was on air.
 In the fifth episode of the VH1 reality/comedy series This Is Hot 97, Cipha Sounds mentioned that he had a crush on Lake and her show. He also noticed an intern who wore the same attire Lake wore on her show, leading him to believe that she was the real Ricki Lake.
 From 2016-2018, NYC-based comedian Matt Smith McCormick produced & hosted a comedy show called "Go Ricki!", where sets & stories were inspired by topics of Ricki Lake.

References

External links
 

1993 American television series debuts
2004 American television series endings
1990s American television talk shows
2000s American television talk shows
English-language television shows
First-run syndicated television programs in the United States
1990s American LGBT-related television series
Television series by Sony Pictures Television
2000s American LGBT-related television series